Global cooling was a 1970s conjecture about global climate change. 

Global cooling may also refer to:
a long-term decline in:
global surface temperature
ocean heat content
Climate change mitigation, means to counteract global warming
Earth's Energy Imbalance, a measurable change in the planet's radiative equilibrium which quantifies its cooling (or heating) rate
Generally, cooling periods in Earth's climate history, see:
in historical times:
Late Antique Little Ice Age
Little Ice Age, a period from the 16th to 19th centuries characterized by cooling and coincident with below average sunspots frequency
within the current glaciation, see stadial
Marine isotope stage
Last Glacial Maximum
Next Glacial Maximum
on a geologic time scale, see ice age
Snowball Earth
Geophysical global cooling, a conjecture about the formation of natural features that was made obsolete by the theory of plate tectonics

See also
Geologic temperature record
Paleoclimatology
Climate change (general concept)
Climate change denial
Global warming